Requiem Aeternam (from Latin, literally meaning 'eternal rest' or 'eternal requiem') is a Uruguayan black/death metal band, founded in September 1995 in Montevideo, Uruguay. They are the creators of a new style within heavy metal known as philosophical metal.

Early history
Requiem Aeternam's first single, "Emergent," featured in the local metal compilation Underscream and was recorded by the band's first incarnation, comprising Martin Lopez (Amon Amarth, Opeth) on drums, Martin Mendez (Opeth) on bass and vocals, Pablo Magallanes (Scarpoint) on guitar and José Romero (Inner Sanctum) on guitar, keyboards and vocals.

In 1997, the band – now a trio with Fabián Redondo on drums, Marcelo Aguilar on bass and José Romero – entered the Studios Record in Montevideo to track their debut LP, which was mixed in Chile by José Corral (Criminal, Inner Sanctum) and mastered in Argentina by David Santos (Riff, Hermética). Eternally Dying was released in July 1998 by ICorp and distributed worldwide by Furias / Orion Music.

The video clip of "Infamy" was aired by MTV Latin America and MTV Brasil as well as many other channels in South America. Afterward, the band completed another video, "Come Back." The "Eternally Tour" (1998–2000) included several shows in Argentina, Brazil, Paraguay and Uruguay.

In 2002, Romero was joined by Maciej Kupiszewski on bass and Alex Hernández (Immolation) on drums. Philosopher, their second LP, was recorded and mixed between May and June 2004 at Big Blue Meenie Studios in Jersey City by Joe Pedulla and Arun Venkatesh (Overkill, All Out War) and mastered in July in New York City by Tom Hutten (Iggy Pop, Foo Fighters). This record was released in December 2004 by Trinity Records Hong Kong in Asia, Europe and North America; in March 2005 by Rawforce Records in South America except Argentina; by Furias / Orion Music in Argentina; and distributed by The Art Records in Mexico and Central America.

Philosopher’s lyrics are based on part of the bibliographies of Gautama, Seneca, Rousseau, Heraclitus, Nietzsche, Kierkegaard and Lao Tzu. Musically, Requiem Aeternam’s style can be defined as 'Philosophic Metal', since it combines different philosophic ideologies with diverse music approaches.

Later history
During 2005, Requiem Aeternam was enlisted in the main metal festivals throughout the USA, including Milwaukee and Norwest Death Metal Fest among others, and participated in numerous metal compilations in Europe and North America. The release party for Philosopher occurred at CBGB's, in New York City, days before this legendary venue was shut down. In addition, the video clip of "Wisdom" was broadcast by various channels in North and Latin America.

In February 2009, with the return of drummer Fabián Redondo, the band registered its third and most ambitious album to date Destiny-Man, recorded at Big 3 Records in St. Petersburg, Florida by Jim Beeman (Cheap Trick, Jefferson Airplane) and mixed at Morrisound Studios in Tampa, Florida by Tom Morris (Sepultura, Obituary). The compositions were inspired by 10 classical composers: Takemitsu, Beethoven, Mozart, Piazzolla, Debussy, Rachmaninoff, Gershwin, Chopin, Paganini and Villa-Lobos.

References

Uruguayan musical groups
Musical groups established in 1995
Death metal musical groups